Shingapoore is a small village in the Mandya district of the Indian state of Karnataka. It is located 5 km north of the Narayanapura village, near the town of Pandavapura.

Amenities
Shingapoore is known for its scenic beauty and temples. The place is a popular film production spot of many Kannada films. Shingapoore is famous for its traditional and cultural beliefs.

See also
 Narayanapura
 Kere Thonnuru
 Pandavapura

Image gallery

References

Villages in Mandya district